Dampiera eriocephala, commonly known as the woolly-headed dampiera, is an erect perennial herb in the family Goodeniaceae. The species, which is endemic to Western Australia.

References

eriocephala
Eudicots of Western Australia
Plants described in 1854
Endemic flora of Western Australia